Mehrabpur, (Sindhi:محرابپور), is a city in the Naushahro Feroze District in the Sindh province of Pakistan. The city is administratively subdivided into 8 Union Councils.
It has a busy railway station on the main railway line between Karachi and Lahore. It is a junction station with a disused branch line to Naushahro Feroze.

History 

Mir Mehrab Khan Talpur came here from Khairpur and made his residence with his family after that most villagers came here and made their residency and name the village Mehrabpur. Mehrabpur was also in the way of the Indus River in previous history. Mehrabpur station was inaugurated in 1914. It has an attractive market that covers most of the surrounding areas. Mehrabpur City Has a Very Large Furniture Market Which is the Largest in Sindh Province after Karachi, Mehrabpur also Has a Large Market Of wheat, and rice  Called Gala Mandi which is the largest in Sindh and Second Largest In Pakistan.
Mehrabpur Also Have Some Notable Names In National Accountability Bureau and In Pakistan Army, Navy, and Police.
Including Director NAB Headquarters Muhammad Imtiaz  Bandesha, and Additional Director NAB Karachi -Operational wing Mr. Salahudin Khan.

Nearby Villages 
Behlani
Behlen (بهلانى) is a historical village (Union Council) situated in the City of Mehrabpur of Sindh in Pakistan. It is located 1 km from Halani (National Highway). It has many nineteenth-century buildings, some of which still have their original architecture. It remains a source of conflict between Kalohars & Mirs'. A nearby town Mehrabpur is named for one of the brave soldiers of Kalhoras' army "Mir Mehrab Khan Jatoi"

Battle of Halani
The Battle of Halani was fought in 1782 between the Afsharid tribe Talpurs and the Sindhi tribe Kalhora for the control of the Sindh region, in modern-day Pakistan. The Talpurs, led by Mir Fateh Ali Khan Talpur, won the battle over Mian Abdul Nabi Kalhoro who became the last ruler of the Kalhora Dynasty. The Talpur dynasty ruled in Sindh until defeated by the British forces at the battle of Miami.

Crops of Mehrabpur 

Rice Crop
Cotton Crop
Wheat Crop
SugarCane Crop
Chillies Crop
Sunflower Crop
Tomato Crop
Maize Crop
Mango Fruit Crop
Dates Fruit Crop
Banana Fruit Crop

The conventional fruit crops raised are mango, guava, grapefruit, lemon, lime, sapodilla, cherimoya, coconut, lychee, and Zizyphus Mauritania.

Union Councils 
Mehrabpur Taluka is administratively further divided into the following 8 Union Councils:
 UC Mehrabpur 1
 UC Mehrabpur 2
 UC Halani
 UC Behlani
 UC Kotri.M.Kabir
 UC Lakha road
 UC Jaindo Rajper
 UC Saeed Pur

Villages 
There are more than a dozen villages in Taluka Mehrabpur. Some of them are mentioned below.
 Goth Molvi Fateh Mohammad Bandesha S/o Bulanda Khan (Jat) Also Known as Bandechha Village.
(Mr. Fateh Mohammad Migrated From Amritsar India Village Fatehgarh Churian, at almost 1922-1925  )
 Village Sohrab Khan Unar 
 Pir Qaim Ali Shah
 Suhrab Soomrah
 Mukhtiarabad
 Allahdad Samtio
 Sialabad
Its a Small Town with a Population of almost Baloch and Palli also Called Bhalli (jut) 
 MalakChodaagi
 BaluKhara
 Thari
 Village Havaldar Chiraghdin
 Bhatti Village
 Village Allah dad Samtio 
 Village sayed Khuda bux shah
 Village Haji Keerio
 Village Majeed Keerio
 village Noor Muhammad haji rajper.

Train crash 
The derailment seems to have been caused by defective rails.

See also 
Rajkumar Hirani
The Educators

References

Naushahro Feroze District
Populated places in Sindh
Mehrabpur Taluka
Talukas of Sindh